On 25 May 2018, a serious collision occurred between a bus, which was travelling from Lira to Kampala, and a tractor, in the Kiryandongo district of Uganda. The incident took place along the Lira-Kampala highway. At least 22 people, including four children were killed.

The commuter bus collided with the rear of the tractor; this impact subsequently caused the bus to careen and roll, resulting in a further collision with an oncoming articulated lorry, which was transporting crates of beer.

The tractor, which was driving without lights at night, was largely cited as the cause of the accident.

Aftermath 
The government declared three days of mourning, and president Yoweri Museveni directed that the families of those who perished in the accident be compensated with USh  for each family and those who were critically injured would receive  each.

References 

2018 in  Uganda 
2018 disasters in Uganda 
Bus incidents
Road incidents in Uganda
Kiryandongo bus accident
May 2018 events in Africa